Shulim or Nikolai Aleksandrovich Notovich (August 13, 1858 – after 1916), known in the West as Nicolas Notovitch,  was a Crimean Jewish adventurer who claimed to be a Russian aristocrat, spy and journalist.

Notovitch is known for his 1894 book claiming that during the unknown years of Jesus, he left Galilee for India and studied with Buddhists and Hindus before returning to Judea. Notovitch's claim was based on a document he said he had seen at the Hemis Monastery while he stayed there. The consensus view amongst modern scholars is that Notovitch's account of the travels of Jesus to India was a hoax.

Notovitch also wrote some political books on the role of Russia in war.

Life of Saint Issa
Notovitch's 1894 book La vie inconnue de Jesus Christ (Life of Saint Issa) claims that during his unknown years, Jesus left Galilee for India and studied with Buddhists and Hindus there before returning to Judea.

Outline of the book

After breaking his leg in India and while recovering from it at the Hemis monastery in Ladakh, Notovitch learned of the Tibetan manuscript Life of Saint Issa, Best of the Sons of Men—Isa being the Arabic name of Jesus in Islam. Notovitch's account, with the text of the Life, was published in French in 1894 as La vie inconnue de Jésus-Christ. It was translated into English, German, Spanish, and Italian.

Allegations of forgery and alleged confession
Notovitch's book generated controversy as soon as it was published. The philologist Max Müller expressed incredulity at the account presented and suggested that either Notovitch was the victim of a practical joke or he had fabricated the evidence. Müller wrote: "Taking it for granted that M. Notovitch is a gentleman and not a liar, we cannot help thinking that the Buddhist monks of Ladakh and Tibet must be wags, who enjoy mystifying inquisitive travelers, and that M. Notovitch fell far too easy a victim to their jokes." Müller then wrote to the head lama at Hemis monastery to ask about the document and Notovitch's story. The head lama replied that there had been no western visitor at the monastery in the previous fifteen years, during which he had been the head lama there, and there were no documents related to Notovitch's story. Other European scholars also opposed Notovitch's account and Indologist Leopold von Schroeder called Notovitch's story a "big fat lie".

J. Archibald Douglas, who was a professor of English and History at the Government College in Agra, then visited the Hemis monastery to interview the head lama, who stated yet again that Notovitch had never been there and that no such documents existed.  Wilhelm Schneemelcher states that Notovich's accounts were soon exposed as fabrications, and that to date no one has even had a glimpse at the manuscripts Notovitch claims to have seen. Notovich at first responded to claims to defend himself. But once his story had been re-examined by historians, Notovitch is said to have confessed to having fabricated the evidence.

Bart D. Ehrman, a Biblical scholar, says that "Today there is not a single recognized scholar on the planet who has any doubts about the matter. The entire story was invented by Notovitch, who earned a good deal of money and a substantial amount of notoriety for his hoax." However, others deny that Notovich ever accepted the accusations against him. Fida Hassnain, a Kashmiri writer, has stated: Notovitch responded publicly by announcing his existence, along with the names of people he met on his travels in Kashmir and Ladakh. ... He also offered to return to Tibet in company of recognized orientalists to verify the authenticity of the verses contained in his compilation. In the French journal La Paix, he affirmed his belief in the Orthodox Church, and advised his detractors to restrict themselves to the simple issue of the existence of the Buddhist scrolls at Hemis.

Although he was not impressed with his story, Sir Francis Younghusband recalls meeting Nicolas Notovitch near Skardu, not long after Notovitch had left Hemis monastery.

Claims of corroboration in India

Although Notovitch had been discredited in Europe, certain individuals in India and America considered his story to have credibility. Swami Abhedananda, who was a colleague of Max Mueller and initially sceptical of Notovitch's claims, claimed to have visited the Hemis monastery in 1922 whilst travelling through Kashmir and Tibet to verify the reports of Notovich that he had heard the previous year in the U.S. He claimed that lamas at the monastery confirmed to him that Notovich was brought to the monastery with a broken leg and he was nursed there for a month and a half.  They also told him that the Tibetan manuscript on Issa was shown to Notovich and its contents interpreted so that he could translate them into Russian.
This manuscript was shown to Abhedananda, which had 14 chapters, containing 223 couplets (slokas). The Swami had some portions of the manuscript translated with the help of a lama, about 40 verses of which appeared in the Swami's travelogue. The original Pali manuscript—allegedly composed after Christ's resurrection—was said to be in the monastery of Marbour near Lhasa.

After his return to Bengal, the Swami asked his assistant Bhairab Chaitanya to prepare a manuscript of the travelogue based on the notes he had taken. The manuscript was published serially in Visvavani, a monthly publication of the Ramakrishna Vedanta Samiti, in 1927 and subsequently published in a book form in Bengali.  The fifth edition of the book in English was published in 1987, which also contains an English translation of Notovich's Life of Saint Issa as an appendix.

Paramahansa Yogananda wrote that Nicholas Roerich also corroborated Notovich's and Abhedananda's story during his visit to Tibet in the mid-1920s. He also wrote that "records of Jesus's years in India were preserved in Puri, according to Bharati Krishna Tirtha, and that after leaving Puri Jesus spent "six years with the Sakya Buddhist sect in... Nepal and Tibet", before returning to Palestine. He added that "the overall value of these records is inestimable in a search for the historical Jesus".

Other authors' references
Author Alice Dunbar Nelson includes a review of The Unknown Life of Jesus Christ in her 1895 collection Violets and Other Tales.
In 1899 Mirza Ghulam Ahmad wrote Jesus in India (published in 1908) and claimed that Jesus had traveled to India after surviving his crucifixion, but specifically disagreed with Notovitch that Jesus had gone to India before then.

Other authors have taken these themes and incorporated it into their own works. For example, in her book The Lost Years of Jesus: Documentary Evidence of Jesus' 17-Year Journey to the East, Elizabeth Clare Prophet asserts that Buddhist manuscripts provide evidence that Jesus traveled to India, Nepal, Ladakh and Tibet. In his book Jesus Lived in India, German author Holger Kersten promoted the ideas of Nicolas Notovich and Mirza Ghulam Ahmad. Gerald O'Collins classified Kersten's work as the repackaging of the same stories.  In his 2002 comedic novel Lamb: The Gospel According to Biff, Christ's Childhood Pal, absurdist author Christopher Moore parodies the notion that between the ages of 15 and 30, Jesus traveled to Tibet to study Buddhism in a monastery (after first having traveled to Afghanistan), then to India to study Hinduism.

Other writings
In 1906 Notovitch published a book in Russian and French, pleading for Russia's entry into the Triple Entente with France and England. It is entitled in French: La Russie et l'alliance anglaise: étude historique et politique. He also wrote biographies of Tsar Nicolas II and Alexander III. He had also written L'Europe à la veille de la guerre.

References
Footnotes

Citations

Sources

Further reading

 Fader, H. Louis, The Issa Tale That Will Not Die: Nicholas Notovich and His Fraudulent Gospel (University Press of America, 2003). 

 Paratico, Angelo, The Karma Killers, New York, 2009. This is a novel based on Notovitch's story, set in modern times with flashbacks to the time of Jesus and to World War II. Most of it is based in Hong Kong and Tibet. It was first printed in Italy under the title Gli Assassini del Karma, Rome 2003.

External links
 
 
 
 La vie inconnue de Jesus Christ (original, in French), Internet Archive
 The Unknown Life of Jesus Christ by Nicolas Notovitch, audio book, YouTube.

1858 births
Year of death missing
Russian journalists
Russian writers
Jewish writers
Converts to Eastern Orthodoxy from Judaism
Russian Jews
Pseudohistorians